The Structural Adjustment Participatory Review International Network (SAPRIN), based in Washington, D.C., United States and launched by the World Bank and its former president, James Wolfensohn in 1997, is a coalition of civil society organizations, their governments and the World Bank researching about structural adjustment programs and exploring new policies implemented by the International Monetary Fund (IMF) and the World Bank in developing countries.

The last SAPRI report was published in 2004.

References

External links

  (Archived version from 2008-01-13)

Economic development organizations